Antiaropsis is a genus of flowering plants belonging to the family Moraceae. It is dioecious, with male and female flowers borne on separate plants.

Its native range is New Guinea.

Species:

Antiaropsis decipiens 
Antiaropsis uniflora

References

Moraceae
Moraceae genera
Dioecious plants